Sirivella is a mandal in Nandyal district of Andhra Pradesh, India.

Geography
It has an average elevation of 201 meters (800 feet).

History

Officially the name has been written as Sirvel since British rule. Sirivella was a Taluk, but in 1956 it was changed to a Mandal.

Villages
Sirivella Mandal comprises the villages of:

  GUMPARAMANDINNE 
  RAJANAGARAM
  JEENE PALLE
  VANIKEMDINNE
  KOTAPADU
  KAMINENI PALLE
  CHENNURU
  MOTHUKULAPALLY
  ISUKAPALLI
  GOVINDAPALLI
  GANGAVARAM 
  BOYALAKUNTLA
  GUNDAMPADU
  VEERAREDDYPALLI
  KADARABADARA
  YERAGUNTLA
  VENKATAPURAM
  MAHADEVAPURAM
  PACHHARLA

References

Mandals in Nandyal district